Rajashree Shantaram (born 8 October 1944), known as Rajshree, is an Indian actress of Bollywood. She is best known for her work in the movies Janwar and Brahmachari.

Personal life
Rajshree is the daughter of acclaimed Indian filmmaker V. Shantaram and actress Jayshree, second wife of V. Shantaram. Her brother Kiran Shantaram was a former Sheriff of Mumbai.

While shooting with Raj Kapoor in America for the film Around the World, she met American student Greg Chapman. The two married three years later, in an Indian ceremony that lasted five days. She went with her husband to permanently live in America. They have one daughter. They live in Los Angeles.

She has been living in America for the last 30 years running a very successful custom clothing business with her husband, while still maintaining her interest in films. She was an assistant director on Hack-O-Lantern, Tainted Love and Monsoon and has done narration on a children's video titled "Ashok By Another Name".

Filmography

References

External links

Actresses in Hindi cinema
20th-century Indian actresses
Indian emigrants to the United States
American Hindus
Living people
1944 births
American actresses of Indian descent
21st-century American women